The Battle of Şarköy or Sarkoy operation took place between 9 and 11 February 1913 during the First Balkan War between Bulgaria and the Ottoman Empire. The Ottomans attempted a counter-attack, but were defeated by the Bulgarians at the Battles of Bulair and Şarköy.

References 

Battles of the First Balkan War
Conflicts in 1913
Battles involving Bulgaria
Battles involving the Ottoman Empire
History of Tekirdağ Province
Adrianople vilayet
1913 in the Ottoman Empire
February 1913 events